Soul Power is the debut studio album by American singer Curtis Harding, released May 6, 2014, by Burger Records. It encompasses a wide breadth of genres, though it is primarily inspired by soul music and his mother's gospel singing. The album received generally favorable reviews from music critics.

Background and development

Before Soul Power, Curtis Harding had worked with several artists of various genres, including backing R&B and hip hop recording artist CeeLo Green and collaborating with members of the rock bands Black Lips and Mastodon. As a child, Harding was influenced by his mother's gospel music while touring. He also sees the evolution of gospel music as parallel with the history of African Americans in the United States, as the foundation of many musical genres. "From hardship and trials, you make something beautiful," he told The 405.

According to Harding, many songs of Soul Power are inspired by relationships with his family and friends. "It's about love, love lost," he said prior to the album's release. "It's about overcoming different things." He also said that he sought to make the album accessible to broad audiences by incorporating many genres.

Recording and release

In 2014, Harding recorded Soul Power at Living Room Studios in Atlanta, Georgia, with Justin McNeight and Edward Rawls. They spent two weeks and recorded 20 songs; 12 were included on the album. Randy Michael composed the music to "Keep on Shining" (with Harding's lyrics); writer Jason Reynolds worked on two songs with Harding; and Harding co-wrote several other songs.

Burger Records released Soul Power on May 6, 2014. The album's cover image is a black-and-white photograph by Hedi Slimane of Harding, shirtless, smoking a cigarette.

Composition

Harding calls his musical genre "slop 'n' soul", based on the leftovers of music he has encountered; the influence of many genres is evident. His voice – kept mellow throughout the album – ranges "from smoky croon to silky falsetto." Musically, Soul Power draws primarily from classic soul music. "Foot-stomping backbeats, brassy guitar-work, and booming horns" across the album are taken from 1960s soul.

In Soul Power, examples of other genres include the indie rock guitar part of "I Don't Wanna Go Home"; the garage rock groove of "Drive My Car"; the disco style of "Heaven's on the Other Side". Classic rock and roll is featured in "Surf" (a song inspired by The Walking Dead) and "I Don't Wanna Go Home" in contrast to the balladry of "Castaway". The lyrics of the somber, gospel-inspid song "Freedom" imply a connection with roots of soul music and slavery. "Keep on Shining" is shaped by a dynamic rhythm reminiscent of northern soul paired with brass flair and falsetto backing vocals.

Reception

Harding was commended for his voice. "Harding's ability to keep every song in line with his personable singing and no-nonsense guitar is what makes this LP truly special – well, that and the fact that there’s not a bum track on it," wrote Michael Toland of Blurt. "Harding is an undeniably versatile vocal talent, as you’d expect from someone schooled firstly in gospel choirs and then as a backing singer for CeeLo Green," wrote Tim Jonze of The Guardian. "But ... it's hard to detect what he's bringing fresh to the mix. Too often, Harding's new blues and soul sound very much like the old versions."

Track listing
Adapted from AllMusic.

Personnel

Adapted from AllMusic.

 Cole Alexander – featured artist, guitar
 Chris Case – keyboards
 Ben Davis – clarinet, tenor saxophone
 Lucas Donaud – logo
 Darren English – trumpet
 Curtis Harding – composer, guitar, mixing, primary artist, producer
 Justin McNeight – engineer, mastering, mixing, percussion
 Taylor Kennedy – baritone saxophone
 Randy Michael – composer
 Tyler Morris – guitar
 Noah Pine – keyboards
 Edward Rawls – engineer, mastering, mixing
 Jason Reynolds – composer
 Hedi Slimane – photography
 Jared Swilley – bass, composer, featured artist
 Andrew Teems – composer, guitar
 Sean Thompson – bass, guitar
 Curtis Whitehead – bass
 Caleb Williams – trumpet

Charts

References

External links
 

Curtis Harding albums
2014 debut albums